Leeds Ashley Road F.C. was an English football club based in Leeds, West Yorkshire.

History
The team participated in the Yorkshire Football League, Northern Counties East League and FA Vase.

References

Defunct football clubs in England
Defunct football clubs in West Yorkshire
Castleford
Yorkshire Football League
Association football clubs disestablished in 1983
1983 disestablishments in England
Northern Counties East Football League